Elche is a city and municipality of Spain, belonging to the province of Alicante, in the Valencian Community. According to 2014 data, Elche has a population of 228,647 inhabitants, making it the third most populated municipality in the region (after Valencia and Alicante) and the 20th largest Spanish municipality. It is part of the comarca of Baix Vinalopó.

A small creek called Vinalopó flows through the city. Elche is the centre of the footwear industry in Spain. The main airport of the province of Alicante (Alicante–Elche Miguel Hernández Airport) is located inside Elche's municipality, and it serves both Elche and Alicante, being the fifth-busiest airport in Spain.

Together with Alicante and other municipalities, Elche form a conurbation of some 800,000 inhabitants. The city is noted by its urban Palm Grove, designated as World Heritage Site.

History 

L'Alcúdia is 10 km from the current city's location and the immediate predecessor of current day Elche. This original location was settled by the Greeks and then occupied by Carthaginians and Romans. Greek Ionian colonists from the Achaean city Helike established their new colony, naming it Helíkē around 600BC. It was a point of resistance against Carthaginian advance in Spain between the First and Second Punic Wars. The Romans called the city Ilici or Illice and granted it the status of colonia; after a brief Byzantine rule, the Goths took over, establishing an episcopal see.

Elche lost importance during the period of Moorish occupation, when it was moved slightly north to its present location. James II of Aragon took the city from the Moors in the 13th century, during the Reconquista. The city grew throughout the 18th century and became more important during the 19th century with the arrival of the railway and a booming industrial development of what used to be the traditional footwear industry.

Many archaeological remains have been found in Elche, with the stone bust of the Lady of Elche (Dama de Elche/Dama d'Elx in Spanish and Valencian, respectively) being the most important. This may date from the Iberian period (4th century BC). The original is in the National Archaeological Museum of Spain.

Elche was granted the title of city by King Amadeo in 1871.

The espadrille industry developed in the 19th century, eventually becoming the leading Spanish municipality at producing textile footwear. By the late century, local entrepreneurs began to invest in leather footwear factories. The footwear industry grew during the Great War and thereafter.

Geography 
The city is known for the Palmeral de Elche, that is an UNESCO World Heritage Site and is the only palm grove in Europe with North African origins and the largest on the continent. The Palm Grove also constitutes the northernmost and one of the largest palm groves in the world. Today, the city of Elche contains 97 orchards composed of 70,000 date palms, concentrated in the east bank of the Vinalopó. Outside the Elche city domain, other large plantations contain approximately 130,000 date palms. In total, Elche and its vicinity hold 200,000 palms. The Palm Grove ranges over 3.5 km2 (1.4 sq mi), including 1.5 km2 (0.58 sq mi) within the city of Elche. The Palm Grove of Elche comprises the National Artistic Garden, Palm Grove Museum, Route of El Palmeral, and Municipal Park.

It shares borders with Santa Pola, Guardamar del Segura, San Fulgencio, Dolores, Catral, Crevillent, Aspe, Montforte del Cid and Alicante. The most remarkable landform is Vinalopó River.

According to the Spanish Statistical Institute, there are 20 localities in the municipality besides the main town. The main town had a population of 190,821 in 2019 The number of people living in the other localities came up to 41,821 in the same year. Algoda was home to 2,650 people, Algorós has a population of 638, Altabix was inhabited by 2,829 people, El Altet was home to 5,750 people Atsavares was home to 1,328 people, Asprella had a population of 403, Las Bayas was home to 2,975 people, Carrús was inhabited by 1,300 people, Daimés had a population of 1,190, El Derramador was home to 419 people, La Foia was inhabited by 2,804 people, Jubalcoi had a population of 1,215, El Pla de Sant Jose was home to 2,411 people, Maitino was inhabited by 890 people, La Marina had a population of 2,008, La Perleta was home to 1,376 people, Puçol was inhabited by 900 people, Torrellano had a population of 7,480, Vallverda was home to 1,767 people and Los Arenales del Sol was inhabited by 2,019 people.

The local government also acknowledges Matola, which is part of Algoda according to the Spanish Stadistical Institute; Penya de les Àguiles, which is part of El Pla de Sant Josep according to the same institution, and Santa Anna, which is not recognised by the Stadistical Institute.

Demographics 
10.497% inhabitants are foreigners – 3.267% come from other countries of Europe, 3.369% are African, 2.46% are American, 1.139% are Asian and 15 people from Oceania and stateless people reside in the municipality. The table below shows the population trend of 20th and 21st centuries by the beginning of their decades.

Economy 
There are other economic activities in Elche: agriculture (dates, olives, cereals and pomegranates), although it has lost importance in recent years; rubber industry; trade, which employs 20% of the workforce; and tourism.

Elche has a conference centre (called Ciutat d'Elx), an international airport (Aeropuerto de Alicante) a public University, Universidad Miguel Hernández, and a private University, Universidad CEU Cardenal Herrera.

Climate 
Elche has a hot semi-arid climate (Köppen climate classification: BSh) close to a desert climate (BWh) with mild, dry winters and hot, dry summers. The city enjoys between 2,900 and 3,000 hours of sunshine per year and the rainfall is scarce year-round.

Elche's annual average temperature is above .

Main sights 

 Palmeral of Elche ("The Palm Grove of Elche", Palmerar d'Elx in Valencian). It is an orchard of over 200,000 palm trees that was declared a World Heritage Site by UNESCO in 2000.
 Altamira Castle, also known as Alcázar de la Señoría, located next to the Municipal Park (which, in turn, is a part of the Elche Palm Grove). It was originally built in Almohad times (12th-13th centuries), and was later renovated with brick exterior in the 15th century. A former fortress, in 1913 it became a fabric plant, it has also been used as the town hall and as a prison during the Spanish Civil War, while today is home to the Elche Archaeology and History Museum.
 Baños Arabes (Arabic Baths), which re-uses old Roman baths.
 Basilica of Santa Maria: The current temple was built in 1672. Previously, there were other temples in the same place, but they disappeared owing to several factors. It has a la Latin-cross plan, a large nave and four side chapels. A large dome has been constructed over the crossing.
 Calahorra Tower, of rectangular plan and Rabic origin, it represent the last relic of the old city walls.
 Municipio (Town Hall): it includes a tower named la torre del consell, and it is the most ancient structure in the south of the Valencian Community. It was built in the mid-15th century.
 Convento de la Merced: it was built in a place where there were Arabic baths. It dates back to 1270, when the prince Juan Manuel bestowed the baths to the grand master of a religious order.
 Huerto del Cura: it is part of the Palmeral of Elche and hosts nearly 500 palm trees. There are individuals of the imperial palm species.
 Elche Palaeontological Museum: more than 1,200 fossils are on display in the museum. Some elements such as remains of mastodons and replicas of dinosaurs are placed in the building.
 Elche Municipal Festa Museum: it was built in 1997 and it hosts elements about the Misteri d'Elx performance.
 Palm Groves Museum: This museum is allocated in a traditional 19th century building. This museum is devoted to the history, the evolution and the characteristics of the Palmeral of Elche.

The Mystery Play of Elx (better known as Misteri d'Elx, in Valencian) is a sacral-lyrical medieval drama, dated from the 15th century, which was declared a Masterpiece of the Oral and Intangible Heritage of Humanity by UNESCO in 2002. It is played every year in mid August, in the context of the local holidays dedicated to the Assumption of Virgin Mary. Also as a part of this celebration, on the 13th of August is the date of a celebration in Elche called Nit de l'Albà (Night of the Dawn) in which a citywide night-long show of fireworks takes place.

Transport
The Autopista AP-7 serves the outskirts of the city, and the railway linking Alicante and Murcia del Carmen runs through a tunnel underneath the city, with two underground stations; Elche-Parque and Elche-Carrús. These are served by line C–1 of the Cercanías Murcia/Alicante commuter rail service, along with Media Distancia trains between Valencia Nord station and Murcia.

The Madrid–Levante high-speed rail network was extended to reach a new station named Elche-Matola in 2021, branching off from the line to Alicante near Monforte del Cid. The new AVE station contains parking space for 500 cars and 50 motorcycles.

Festivities 

 Holy Week: as generally in Spain, several processions (festive religious parades) occur during the festive period.
 Moros i Cristians: it occurs in the first fortnight of August. The theme of this festivity is the Muslim rule that occurred in the High Middle Ages and part of the Late Middle Ages and the battles which took place between Christians and Muslims as a consequence of this occupation. A more specific subject of this festivity is the Reconquista.
 Nit de la Roà: it takes place in mid August.
 Christmas: A nativity scene is placed in the town and a living nativity scene also occurs during the festive period. A parade which theme is the Three Wise Men is also performed in the Epiphany's Eve (5 January).

Notable people
Marceliano Coquillat (1865–1924), architect.
Saúl Ñíguez (b. 1994), a footballer. He is currently playing in Liga BBVA for Atlético de Madrid.
Aarón Ñíguez (b. 1989), a footballer.
Sílvia Soler Espinosa (b. 1987), an ex-tennis player. She played in tournaments in the WTA. Her record position was semifinalist in the Strasbourg tour.
Francisco Mojica (b. 1963), a microbiologist noted for his research on the CRISPR gene editing technique.

Twin towns 
 Toulouse, France (since 1981)
 San Bartolomé de Tirajana, Spain (since 1982)
 Jaca, Spain (since 1984)

Culture

Cultural theatrical spaces

The Grand Theater 
The Elche Grand Theater is a theatrical space constructed at the beginning of the 20th Century, created by the architect Alfonso Garín. It was opened in 1920 with the name Kursaal Theater. The interior of the room is in a horseshoe shape, where an orchestra section in front of the stage and two amphitheaters with box seats on the sides can be found. At the beginning of the 90s, the building was acquired by the local government, becoming municipal property. After a reform, the theater was reopened on May 16, 1996, by Queen Sofía. The theater is found in the historical area of the city, very close to the Glorieta. The Grand Theater houses all types of theatrical, dance, and musical performances.

L’Escorxador Center for Contemporary Culture 
Opened on November 7, 2008, in the installations of the old Elche Slaughterhouse - constructed in the decade of 1940 - is a 5000 m2 space oriented to the young public. The complex is divided into four pavilions: in the first one there is a theatrical space with more than 150 chairs, allocated for housing theatrical, resonant, and visual art shows; the second pavilion, called The Nave, is home to the multipurpose room where plastic art exhibitions, as well as open essays and special representations of performance, theater and music, are celebrated; in the third, rehearsal rooms that are available for rent, loan or assignment for the sound arts can be found; the fourth pavilion is the most spacious of the four, and houses the different studios that the center has as well as a small room of temporary exhibitions called Sala Lanart. In addition to the pavilions, the center has - since 2009 - a terrace in which performances and projections can be carried out outside.

La Llotja Cultural Room 
The room is located in the remodeled installations of the old fruit and vegetable market from the Altabix neighborhood constructed between 1941 and 1942. It was opened on April 12, 2008, and is a place where dance, theater, and music shows intended for young audiences are carried out, as well as school graduations and other events that can take place in it. In the time of elections, it is used as an electoral college.

Museums

Alejandro Ramos Folqués Archaeological and History Museum of Elche 
The Alejandro Ramos Folqués Archaeological and History Museum of Elche has been turned into an archaeological cultural model at a regional level of great importance. Situated in the interior of the Altamira Palace - in the Elche historical center and very close to Saint María basilica - it was opened on May 18, 2006, with a grand exhibition about Iberic culture, among where the Lady of Elche was found - one of the most significant pieces of Iberic art, transferred temporarily by the National Archaeological Museum for six months (from May 18 to November 1 in 2006).

Like a permanent exhibition, the museum offers a general overview of the distinct stages that have been taking place in the city, such as the Neolithic, the Copper Age, the Bronze Age, the Iberian stage, the process of Romanization, the Visigothic era, and the Islamic settlement (current site of the city) until the present.

The archaeological remains come from, among others, the Alcudia site, Elche Park (situated in one of the gardens in the city and which has provided important sculptural remains) and El Arenero de Monforte del Cid.

Festa Museum 
The Festa Museum, about the Mystery of Elche, originated with the intention of showing La Festa to the visitors that come to the city throughout the year. The museum is made of two rooms: the first is where scenic tradition that involves the Mystery is collected, which can be posters, sketches, crowns, costumes, guitars...and the other is a more dynamic room, where new technologies are used, combining many visual images like typical smells and sounds from La Festa. Part of the museum is located in what was Saint Sebastian's Shrine, which is also closely linked to Assumptionist drama and was restored for the purpose of creating the museum.

Palm Grove Museum (Palmeral Museum)

Museo del Palmeral 
The Palm Grove Museum, found in a traditional house of the Garden of Saint Placidus (Huerto de San Plácido), close to the Garden of Healing (Huerto del Cura). The museum is dedicated to recognizing the municipal relationship with the palm groves. It shows the origins, history, culture of the palm grove, as well as the uses and its evolution. In the rooms, an overview of the history of the Palm Grove is shown through videos, panels, demonstrative elements and sounds, which continues with a visit to its own garden outside.

The Traditional Culture Center Pusol School Museum 
The Traditional Culture Center Pusol School Museum was created in the year 1969 as an activity linked to the Pedagogical Project “The School and its Fear,” which developed the study of the purposes and traditions of the Field of Elche (Campo de Elche). In the museum, unique collections are housed that show distinct ethnological aspects (agriculture, business, industry, folklore, traditions, etc.) available for scientific studies at all levels. In 2009, it was included by UNESCO in the Register of Good Safeguarding Practices for Intangible Cultural Heritage.

In addition to these, other museums and places of interest exist in Elche:

 Paleontological Museum in the plaza of Saint Juan Church.
 Alcudia Museum, situated in the archaeological site where the Lady of Elche was found.
 Museum of Contemporary Art, in the Raval neighborhood.
 Museum of the Assumption of the Virgin, Patron Saint of Elche Museum dedicated to the Assumption of the Virgin.
 Visitors center in the Municipal Park, with audiovisual projections about the city.
 Municipal Center of Exhibitions, with seasonal nature exhibitions.
 The Center of Exhibitions of the Lonja, which is situated on the first floor of the Town Hall, occasionally houses exhibitions, primarily with themes related to the city.
 Espai d’Art, which is a walk near the Municipal Park where we can contemplate contemporary art sculptures.
 Arabian baths, which are found in the inside of the Clarisas Convent.

See also 
 Elche CF
 Medieval Festival of Elx
 Route of the Castles of Vinalopó

Notes

References 
Citations

Bibliography

 Britannica, The Editors of Encyclopedia. "Elche". Encyclopædia Britannica, 9 Feb. 2014, https://www.britannica.com/place/Elche.
 The Editors of Spain.info. “Tourism in Elche.” Spain.info, https://www.spain.info/en/destination/elche-elx/.
 The Editors of WordReference. “Word Reference.” Wordreference.com, n.d., https://www.wordreference.com/.
 The Editors of Wiktionary. "Dándose." Wiktionary, The Free Dictionary. 25 May 2017, https://en.wiktionary.org/w/index.php?title=d%C3%A1ndose&oldid=44505375.
 Royuela, María. “The Register of Good Safeguarding Practices for Intangible Cultural Heritage: The Pusol School Museum.” ResearchGate, Dec. 2018, https://www.researchgate.net/publication/341119955_The_Register_of_Good_Safeguarding_Practices_for_Intangible_Cultural_Heritage_The_Pusol_School_Museum.

External links 

 Ayuntamiento de Elche, Elche Municipality  
 Instituto Valenciano de Estadística City official statistics 
 Turisme d'Elx, City council official Tourist guide 

 
Municipalities in the Province of Alicante
Greek colonies in Iberia
Ancient Greek archaeological sites in Spain